Mount Gardiner is a rural locality in the Livingstone Shire, Queensland, Australia. In the  Mount Gardiner had a population of 34 people.

Geography 
Mount Gardiner has the following mountains:

 Crows Nest
 Mount Benmore 
 Mount Gardiner
 Mount Mckenzie

History 
In the  Mount Gardiner had a population of 34 people.

Education 
There are no schools in Mount Gardiner. The nearest primary schools are Marlborough State School in neighbouring Marlborough to the north-east and Clarke Creek State School in neighbouring Clarke Creek to the north-west.

There are no secondary schools nearby. Distance education and boarding schools would be options.

References 

Shire of Livingstone
Localities in Queensland